Bal Rud (also Romanized as Bāl Rūd; also known as Bāl Rū) is a village in Zilayi Rural District, Margown District, Boyer-Ahmad County, Kohgiluyeh and Boyer-Ahmad Province, Iran. At the 2006 census, its population was 452, in 101 families.

References 

Populated places in Boyer-Ahmad County